, also known as Jomon Bank Aomori Velodrome, is a velodrome located in Aomori City that conducts pari-mutuel Keirin racing - one of Japan's four authorized  where gambling is permitted. Its Keirin identification number for betting purposes is 12# (12 sharp).

Aomori's oval is 400 meters in circumference. A typical keirin race of 2,025 meters consists of five laps around the course.

Due to its location in the northern part of Tohoku, races at Aomori Velodrome are held during warm weather months, from April to November.

External links
Aomori Keirin Home Page (Japanese)
keirin.jp Aomori Information (Japanese)

Velodromes in Japan
Cycle racing in Japan
Sports venues in Aomori (city)
Sports venues completed in 1950
1950 establishments in Japan